Almacelles is a town in the comarca of Segrià, in Catalonia, Spain with a population of 6,800 as of 2016.

References

External links
 Government data pages 

Municipalities in Segrià